Dichomeris acrogypsa is a moth in the family Gelechiidae. It was described by Turner in 1919. It is found in Australia, where it has been recorded from Queensland.

The forewings are fuscous with a slight purple tinge and fine blackish dorsal strigulae. The apical one-fourth is whitish with a few fuscous and blackish scales. The hindwings are grey.

References

Moths described in 1919
acrogypsa